Paraivongius chalceatus is a species of leaf beetle of Cameroon, Ivory Coast and Mali. It was first described by Édouard Lefèvre in 1891.

References

Eumolpinae
Beetles of Africa
Insects of Cameroon
Insects of West Africa
Beetles described in 1891
Taxa named by Édouard Lefèvre